The NZJ "Lushan", also registered as the NZJ1 are a class of diesel multiple unit (DMU) of China Railway. These sets were built by Tangshan Locomotive in a 2M2T layout of four cars with Cummins diesel engines and Siemens electrical equipment. Three sets were built in total between 1998 and 2000, with two operated by Nanchang Railway Bureau and one by Kunming Railway Bureau.

Development history

Background 
From the mid-1990s, short distance and intercity services saw great decreases in passenger volume, due to competition from highways. To win back patronage on mid to short distance journeys, the Tangshan Locomotive with the support of the Ministry of Railways technological development department and China Railways Locomotive Company, started developing a new DMU in 1996, designed for intercity transport. In April 1997, the first such vehicle was rolled out at Tangshan Locomotive, an electrical transmission DMU, for Harbin Railway Bureau. Afterwards, the designers started work for a double deck DMU design, which would become the NZJ class DMU.

Service history 
In May 1998, Tangshan Locomotive completed the development of the first double-decker diesel multiple unit; on the 22 and 23 of the same month, the set underwent running in on the Beijing–Qinhuangdao railway and the Beijing–Chengde railway, which also included a safety test, with the highest speed reached in the test being . It was presented on 29 May 1998 at Tangshan Locomotive. It was handed over to Nanchang Railway Bureau on 5 June. Operation began on 18 June after it was named "Lushan", carrying passengers on the intercity service form Nanchang to Jiujiang, taking around 1.5 hours for the journey, faster than the two hours by coach. This led to the increase of passenger train traffic, and the set became a symbol for the newer generation of trains that would serve the railways and it was featured on train tickets. The second set was completed by Tangshan Locomotive in November 1999, and handed over to Nanchang Bureau. However, due to the short period of development and testing, the service of these sets revealed multiple flaws, and they had a very poor reliability. Due to this, Nanchang Bureau only paid about 40% of the fees for the set (around ), with the rest being withheld due to the quality issues. After 1999, when Nanchang Bureau bought the more conventional but simpler to operate NYJ1 locomotive hauled passenger trains, the use of the NZJ sets was reduced to mainly running services during peak periods, such as the Chunyun period. Up until 2005, the NZJ still ran N621/622 from Nanchang to Yushan and N629/630, from Nanchang to Jingdezhen.

After 2006, the NZJ were stored at Nanchang depot. They were formally deregistered in August 2011, with tenders for the sale of the sets for scrapping being posted. Both sets were scrapped by the end of the year.

Derivative vehicles 
A third NZJ set, designated NZJ1-0002 was originally completed in March 2000 as part of an order of two from Jitong railway. However, for reasons unknown, the set was not accepted, and the order was switched to 25G carriages instead. It is also unknown whether the second car in the order was ever constructed. This set was eventually purchased by Kunming Railway Bureau and underwent a refurbishment at Tangshan Locomotive in August 2004, and was handed over in the first half of 2005, entering service in September.

Although the car was later designated with the prefix SWX (rail inspection vehicle), the equipment for it, such as infrared scanners, were never installed. It continued to run as a passenger vehicle in either intercity or tourist services, depending on the source although the set spent much of the time as a parked at Kunming depot. It underwent a repair at Kunming in April 2007.

The main differences of this third set was that instead of a all hard seat layout, it has a hard sleeper and a soft sleeper car, along with two hard seat cars. As it was ordered for a different bureau, the paint of the set is somewhat different. It also had a different bogie for the trailers and differences in the location of car doors.

This set did not serve long, exiting service in 2011, then formally withdrawn in 2012, and has been stored near  since 2014.

Technical features

Overall structure 
The NZJ has a two motor, two trailer layout, with motor cars on either end and trailer cars in the middle. The layout of the motor car, from front to back is driver's cabin, motor room, passenger cabin and electrical cabin. Apart from the driver's door, all other doors are plug doors. The motor room houses the prime mover, fuel pumps, water tank, cooling equipment and other auxiliary equipment. The electrical cabin houses the control electronics, air conditioner equipment and controls and transformers. The two NZJ sets delivered to Nanchang Bureau are fitted with only 'hard' seats, which were arranged in a 2 by 3 layout. The trailer cars provides toilets, conductor's room, air conditioning controls. Batteries and 1200 litre fuel tanks are located on the trailer cars at the side closest to the motor car. The carriages are thin-walled structures without a central supporting beam, and are connected to each other with a size H15 tightlock coupler and imported rubber gangways. The motor cars have a streamlined fibreglass structure.

Traction system 
Each motor car has an American Cummins QST30-G1 prime mover, which is a 12 cylinder, four stroke, water cooled, v-shaped high speed diesel engine. It has a maximum traction force of 700 kW at 1500 rpm, though the installed power is 634 kW. The NZJ has an AC to DC transmission, with the diesel motor driving a three-phase AC generator, model 1FC5 406-4TA. This is then passed through a transformer and a rectifier, with the ZQDR-110 traction motors using DC power, which is speed regulated through changing voltage.

Control system 
The NZJ used a Siemens S7-300 programmable controller for direct current, and the two motor cars are connected through a RS-485 standard cable, allowing both motors to be controlled at the same time through microcomputers.

Car formation

Flaws 
As an early DMU, the NZJ had numerous flaws that contributed to its prolonged periods out of service. As the controls for traction and electrical generation at both ends were linked to each other, the failure of one caused the other to fail as well, which resulted in the train becoming unmovable due to the loss of power. In summer, this meant the interior would heat up to high temperatures without the air conditioning, as the windows were not openable. Technological limitations meant that the self diagnosis system was not properly developed, and the low level of modularity and proprietary nature of the electrical system meant that the workers at Tangshan Locomotive often did not know how to solve the problems either. Although the design was technically not flawed, it had tolerances that were too low and there were insufficient spare parts available, and without a diagnosis system, it was hard to locate the source of the problem. Performing maintenance on the set was a difficult task, as height restrictions limit the size of the cars, worsened by the double deck design, meaning that the spaces between the bogie and car body were small. As a consequence, maintenance was hard to carry out.

See also 

 DDJ1, an experimental high-speed EMU designed in the same time period
 DJJ1
 DJJ2

References

Note 

Diesel multiple units of China
Diesel multiple units with locomotive-like power cars
CRRC Tangshan